Ultimate Human (originally titled Ultimate Hulk vs. Iron Man) is an American comic book limited series published by Marvel Comics. The limited series set in the Ultimate Universe, is written by Warren Ellis and pencilled by Cary Nord.

The series deals with a desperate Bruce Banner pleading with Tony Stark to cure him of his Hulk affliction.

Plot summary
The story begins with Bruce Banner approaching Tony Stark to assist in curing him of the failed super-soldier serum that still runs through his body. The Leader (an Ultimate amalgam of the original Leader and Pete Wisdom) is shown to be attempting to obtain both men's blood. Tony Stark and Bruce Banner travel to a Stark facility and Stark places Banner under extreme environments (simulating conditions on Venus and Mars), causing him to become the Hulk and revealing that the Hulk is inhumanly capable of adjusting to new environments and situations.

While the Hulk is on a rampage, Tony manages to get himself inside an Iron Man suit. But due to the lack of weapons, Tony must fight Hulk head on. After Tony uses an electroshock to Hulk's brain to cut off the Hulk's anger, Hulk reverts into Bruce Banner. No Iron Man suit had survived more than one punch, while this suit had received two. This amount of damage caused the suit to go into overload, causing Tony to fly off and eject midair; falling to the ground. He survives the fall due to his advanced healing. After Bruce wakes up in the hospital, Tony explains how he has disabled the Hulk using nanites to shut down any Hulk cells that form. Later, Bruce explains to Tony his true intentions for the Super Soldier formula that became the Hulk. He felt that if in the 1940s they could turn a dumb kid into Captain America, who is not only a superb physical specimen but a brilliant military strategist, then a 21st Century formula would turn Bruce Banner into the greatest mind on the planet. Tony tells Bruce to use the time away from the Hulk to work on his Super Soldier formula, and that he can use the Ironworks factory however he pleases. Just then the Leader's men attack Ironworks and kidnap Bruce and Tony.

In Issue 3, the history of The Leader is shown. In the fourth and final issue, Tony shuts down the anti-Hulk nanodes in Bruce's body and provokes the Hulk transformation to defeat the Leader, over Banner's protests and despite the knowledge that the Hulk's physiology will adapt to the nanodes and render them useless in preventing further transformations. The Hulk subsequently escapes and Tony apologizes to Banner for not being able to help him.

Collected edition

See also
 Ultimate Comics: Armor Wars
 Ultimate Wolverine vs. Hulk
 Ultimates

References

External links
 Ultimate Human No. 1 Official Solicitation at Marvel.com
 Ultimate Human No. 1 Review at IGN.com

2008 comics debuts
Human, Ultimate